Daniel Hitchcock (3 January 1908 – April 1996) was an Australian politician.

He was born in Cooma in Victoria. In 1960 he was elected to the Tasmanian Legislative Council as the independent member for Tamar. He held the seat until his retirement in 1979.

References

1908 births
1996 deaths
Independent members of the Parliament of Tasmania
Members of the Tasmanian Legislative Council
20th-century Australian politicians